Garland is an unincorporated community in McDowell County, West Virginia, United States.

The town is on the Norfolk Southern Railway (former Norfolk and Western) network and the Dry Branch of the Tug Fork river.

References

Unincorporated communities in McDowell County, West Virginia
Unincorporated communities in West Virginia